Maybury is a surname. Notable people with the surname include:

A.E. Maybury, English footballer
Alan Maybury (born 1978), Irish footballer
Debra Maybury (born 1971), English cricketer
Ged Maybury (born 1953), New Zealand writer
Henry Maybury (1864–1943), British civil engineer
John Maybury (born 1958), English film director
Kylie Maybury (1978-1984), Australian murder victim 
Mark T. Maybury (born 1964), American computer scientist
Paul Maybury (born 1982), American comics artist and illustrator
Percy Maybury (1893–1963), Australian rules footballer
Richard J. Maybury (born 1946), American writer
Rick Maybury (born 1954), British journalist
Wendy Maybury, American stand-up comedian
William C. Maybury (1848–1909), American politician